Boto is a Portuguese name given to several types of dolphins and river dolphins native to the Amazon and the Orinoco River tributaries. A few botos exist exclusively in fresh water, and these are often considered primitive dolphins.

Classification

The botos are a paraphyletic group, defined largely by their evolutionary convergences.

The genus Sotalia is divided into two species. The costero (S. guianensis) is distributed in the Atlantic, from Florianópolis in Santa Catarina, Brazil, and northwards. The tucuxi (S. fluviatilis) lives in the rivers of the Amazon.

Burmeister's porpoise  is marine and lives from Santa Catarina to the south.

The Amazon river dolphin (Inia geoffrensis) thrives in fresh water, is endemic to the Amazon basin, and is placed in the Endangered category of the IUCN.

The Araguaian river dolphin (I. araguaiaensis) is a newly identified species native to the Araguaia-Tocantins basin of Brazil.

The La Plata dolphin (Pontoporia blainvillei), another vulnerable Brazilian denizen, is a marine river dolphin that ranges from Espírito Santo, Brazil, to the south.

Suborder Odontoceti
Superfamily Delphinoidea
Family Delphinidae
Genus Sotalia
Species Sotalia fluviatilis, tucuxi
Species Sotalia guianensis, costero
Family Phocoenidae
Genus Phocoena
Species Phocoena spinipinnis, Burmeister's porpoise
Superfamily Platanistoidea
Family Iniidae
Genus Inia
Species Inia araguaiaensis 
Species Inia geoffrensis
Subspecies Inia geoffrensis geoffrensis, Amazon river dolphin
Subspecies Inia geoffrensis boliviensis, Bolivian river dolphin
Subspecies Inia geoffrensis humboldtiana, Humboldt's river dolphin
Family Pontoporiidae
Genus Pontoporia
Species Pontoporia blainvillei, la Plata dolphin

Folklore
The 'boto' of the Amazon River regions of northern Brazil, are described according to local lore as taking the form of a human or merman, also known as Boto-cor-de-rosa ("Pink-Boto" in Portuguese) and with the habit of seducing human women and impregnating them.

References

Mammals of Brazil
River dolphins
Mammal common names